Mònica Dòria Vilarrubla (born 4 December 1999) is an Andorran slalom canoeist who has competed at the international level since 2014. Mònica was the flagbearer for Andorra at the 2020 Summer Olympics. She finished 16th in the K1 event and 11th in the C1 event after being eliminated in the semifinals of both.

Career 
Dòria Vilarrubla won a bronze medal in the Extreme K1 event at the 2022 ICF Canoe Slalom World Championships in Augsburg.

She won a gold medal in the C1 event at the 2017 Junior European Championships in Hohenlimburg, Germany. She earned her best senior world championship results of 8th and 30th (C1 and K1, respectively), at the 2019 ICF Canoe Slalom World Championships in La Seu d'Urgell. These results secured her a quota place for the 2020 Summer Olympics in Tokyo, where she represented Andorra in the C1 and K1 events. This was only the second time Andorra has been represented in canoe slalom at the Olympic Games, after Montserrat García Riberaygua competed in the K1 event at the 2008 Beijing Olympics.

She is based in Spain but competes for Andorra.

Results

World Cup individual podiums

Complete World Cup results

Notes
No overall rankings were determined by the ICF, with only two races possible due to the COVID-19 pandemic.

References

External links

Andorran female canoeists
1999 births
Living people
Canoeists at the 2020 Summer Olympics
Olympic canoeists of Andorra
Medalists at the ICF Canoe Slalom World Championships